Durant is a city in Cedar, Muscatine, and Scott counties in the U.S. state of Iowa.  The population was 1,871 at the time of the 2020 census.

The Scott County portion of Durant is part of the Davenport–Moline–Rock Island, IA-IL Metropolitan Statistical Area, while the Muscatine County portion of the city is part of the Muscatine Micropolitan Statistical Area.

History
Durant was platted in 1854 by Benjamin Brayton. The Chicago, Rock Island and Pacific Railroad was built through Durant in 1855. The settlement was first named Brayton for its founder, but the name was later changed to Durant for Thomas C. Durant, one of the pioneers of the Transcontinental Railroad and an individual who contributed the bulk of funds needed to build the town's first public school.

Geography
Durant is located at  (41.6011435, -90.9138461).

Demographics

2010 census
As of the census of 2010, there were 1,832 people, 743 households, and 512 families living in the city. The racial makeup of the city was 98.0% White, 0.1% African American, 0.2% Native American, 0.3% Asian, 0.3% from other races, and 1.0% from two or more races. Hispanic or Latino of any race were 1.7% of the population.

There were 743 households, of which 33.8% had children under the age of 18 living with them, 55.2% were married couples living together, 10.4% had a female householder with no husband present, 3.4% had a male householder with no wife present, and 31.1% were non-families. 26.4% of all households were made up of individuals, and 14% had someone living alone who was 65 years of age or older. The average household size was 2.45 and the average family size was 2.96.

The median age in the city was 40.3 years. 25.2% of residents were under the age of 18; 7.2% were between the ages of 18 and 24; 23.5% were from 25 to 44; 27% were from 45 to 64; and 17% were 65 years of age or older. The gender makeup of the city was 47.1% male and 52.9% female.

2000 census
As of the census of 2000, there were 1,677 people, 672 households, and 469 families living in the city. The racial makeup of the city was 98.81% White, 0.12% African American, 0.18% Native American, 0.12% Asian, 0.06% Pacific Islander, 0.24% from other races, and 0.48% from two or more races. Hispanic or Latino of any race were 0.72% of the population.

There were 672 households, out of which 34.1% had children under the age of 18 living with them, 58.5% were married couples living together, 8.9% had a female householder with no husband present, and 30.2% were non-families. 26.8% of all households were made up of individuals, and 17.3% had someone living alone who was 65 years of age or older. The average household size was 2.48 and the average family size was 3.01.

In the city, the population was spread out, with 26.4% under the age of 18, 7.3% from 18 to 24, 28.7% from 25 to 44, 20.6% from 45 to 64, and 17.1% who were 65 years of age or older. The median age was 38 years. For every 100 females, there were 88.0 males. For every 100 females age 18 and over, there were 86.6 males.

The median income for a household in the city was $41,681, and the median income for a family was $51,667. Males had a median income of $37,188 versus $22,500 for females. The per capita income for the city was $19,399. About 3.8% of families and 5.8% of the population were below the poverty line, including 4.2% of those under age 18 and 13.0% of those age 65 or over.

Education
The Durant Community School District, which is home to the Durant Wildcats, covers Durant and the surrounding rural areas. The school district includes an elementary school, a middle school, and a high school, with nearly all buildings connected and situated on a single campus.

Transportation

Media
The Wilton-Durant Advocate News is a weekly newspaper that is circulated in the Durant area and surrounding communities. Daily newspapers such as The Muscatine Journal and the Quad-City Times are available in Durant.

Notable people
 Troy Pricepolitical strategist and former Chair of the Iowa Democratic Party

See also
St. Paul's Episcopal Church (Durant, Iowa)

References

External links
 
 Durant Chamber of Commerce

Cities in Cedar County, Iowa
Cities in Muscatine County, Iowa
Cities in Scott County, Iowa
Cities in Iowa
Cities in the Quad Cities 
Muscatine, Iowa micropolitan area
1854 establishments in Iowa
Populated places established in 1854